Infant mortality is the death of young children under the age of 1. This death toll is measured by the infant mortality rate (IMR), which is the probability of deaths of children under one year of age per 1000 live births. Similarly, the child mortality rate, also known as the under-five mortality rate compares the death rate of children up to the age of five.

In 2013, the leading cause of infant mortality in the United States was birth defects. Other leading causes of infant mortality include birth asphyxia, pneumonia, congenital malformations, term birth complications such as abnormal presentation of the fetus umbilical cord prolapse, or prolonged labor, neonatal infection, diarrhea, malaria, measles, and malnutrition. One of the most common preventable causes of infant mortality is smoking during pregnancy. Lack of prenatal care, alcohol consumption during pregnancy, and drug use also cause complications which may result in infant mortality. Many situational factors lead to infant mortality, such as the pregnant woman's level of education, environmental conditions, political infrastructure, and level of medical support. Improving sanitation, access to clean drinking water, immunization against infectious diseases, and other public health measures can help reduce high rates of infant mortality.

In 1990, 8.8 million infants younger than 1-year-old died globally out of 12.6 million child deaths under the age of five. More than 60% of the deaths of children under-five are seen as being avoidable with low-cost measures such as continuous breastfeeding, vaccinations, and improved nutrition. The global mortality rate in 1950 was 22.5% which dropped to 4.5% in 2015. Over the same period, the infant mortality rate declined from 65 deaths per 1,000 live births to 29 deaths per 1,000. Globally, 5.4 million children died before their fifth birthday in 2017. 

The child mortality rate, but not the infant mortality rate, was an indicator used to monitor progress towards the Fourth Goal of the Millennium Development Goals of the United Nations for the year 2015. A reduction in child mortality is now a target in the Sustainable Development Goals—Goal Number 3: Ensure healthy lives and promote well-being for all at all ages. Throughout the world, the infant mortality rate (IMR) fluctuates drastically, and according to Biotechnology and Health Sciences, education and life expectancy in the country is the leading indicators of IMR. This study was conducted across 135 countries over the course of 11 years, with the continent of Africa having the highest infant mortality rate of any region studied, with 68 deaths per 1,000 live births.

Classification
Infant mortality rate (IMR) is the number of deaths per 1,000 live births of children under one year of age. The rate for a given region is the number of children dying under one year of age, divided by the number of live births during the year, multiplied by 1,000.

Forms of infant mortality:
 Perinatal mortality is late fetal death (22 weeks gestation to birth) or death of a newborn up to one week postpartum.
Neonatal mortality is newborn death occurring within 28 days postpartum. Neonatal death is often attributed to inadequate access to basic medical care, during pregnancy and after delivery. This accounts for 40–60% of infant mortality in developing countries.
 Postneonatal mortality is the death of children aged 29 days to one year. The major contributors to postneonatal death are malnutrition, infectious disease, troubled pregnancy, sudden infant death syndrome, and problems with the home environment.

Causes 
Causes of infant mortality directly lead to the death. Environmental and social barriers prevent access to basic medical resources and thus contribute to an increasing infant mortality rate; 99% of infant deaths occur in developing countries, and 86% of these deaths are due to infections, premature births, complications during delivery, and perinatal asphyxia and birth injuries. Greatest percentage reduction of infant mortality occurs in countries that already have low rates of infant mortality. Common causes are preventable with low-cost measures. In the United States, a primary determinant of infant mortality risk is infant birth weight with lower birth weights increasing the risk of infant mortality. The determinants of low birth weight include socioeconomic, psychological, behavioral and environmental factors.

Main causes 
There are  three main leading causes of infant mortality; namely Premature-related conditions, Congenital anomalies and Sudden Infant Death Syndrome.  In North Carolina,Premature-related conditions ranked first, with a percentage of 37.5%, followed by congenital anomalies which accounted for 17.4% of the total infant deaths, while Sudden Infant Death Syndrome  accounted for 12.9%.

Premature birth 

Premature, or preterm birth (PTB) is defined as birth before 37 weeks of gestation and can be further sub-classified as extremely PTB (occurring at less than 28 weeks gestation), very preterm birth (occurring between 28 and 32 weeks gestation), and moderate to late PTB (occurring from 32 through 36 weeks gestation). Lower gestational age increases the risk of infant mortality.

Over the last decade, prematurity has been the leading cause of worldwide mortality for neonates and children under the age of five. The overall PTB mortality rate in 2010 was 11.1% (15 million deaths) worldwide and was highest in low to middle-income countries in sub-Saharan Africa and south Asia (60% of all PTBs), compared with high-income countries in Europe, or the United States. Low-income countries also have limited resources to care for the needs of preterm infants, which increases the risk of infant mortality. The survival rate in these countries, for infants born before 28 weeks of gestation is 10%, compared with a 90% survival rate in high-income countries.In the United States, the  past two decades of the 20th century has seen a significant increase in Premature births,despite a decrease in the total number of infant mortality cases.

Based on distinct clinical presentation, there are three main subgroups of preterm births; those that occur due to spontaneous premature labor, those that occur due to spontaneous membrane (Amniotic sac) rapture, and those that are medically induced.  Both spontaneous factors are viewed to be a result of similar causes, hence two main classifications remain: spontaneous and medically induced causes.The risk of spontaneous PTB increases with "extremes of maternal age (both young and old), short inter-pregnancy interval, multiple gestation, assisted reproductive technology, prior PTB, family history, substance abuse, cigarette use, low maternal socioeconomic status, late or no prenatal care, low maternal prepregnancy weight, bacterial vaginosis, periodontal disease, and poor pregnancy weight gain." Medically induced PTB is often conducted when continued pregnancy poses significant risks to the pregnant parent or fetus. The most common attributing factors for medically induced PTB include preeclampsia, diabetes, maternal medical conditions, fetal distress, or developmental problems. Despite these risk factors, the underlying causes of premature infant death are often unknown and approximately 65% of all cases are not associated with any known risk factor.

Infant mortality caused by premature birth is mainly attributed to the various complications of preterm births. A key characteristic of preterm birth is developmental immaturity, which directly impacts different organ systems of the infant's body. The main body systems affected include the respiratory system, which, due to failure of fetal breathing movement, may result in pulmonary hypoplasia, respiratory distress syndrome, bronchopulmonary dysplasia (chronic lung disease), and apnea. Other body systems that rely on later gestational age to fully develop include the gastrointestinal system, the skin, the immune system, the cardiovascular system, and the hematologic system. Poor development of these systems increases the risk of infant mortality.

Understanding the biological causes and predictors is important for identifying and preventing premature birth and infant mortality. While the exact mechanisms responsible for inducing premature birth are often unknown, many of the underlying risk factors are associated with inflammation. Approximately "80% of preterm births that occur at <1000 g or at <28 to 30 weeks of gestation" have been associated with inflammation. Biomarkers of inflammation, including C-reactive protein, ferritin, various interleukins, chemokines, cytokines, defensins and bacteria have been shown to be associated with increased risks of infection or inflammation-related preterm birth. Biological fluids have been utilized to analyze these markers in hopes of understand the pathology of preterm birth, but are not always useful if not acquired at the appropriate gestational time-frame. For example, biomarkers such as fibronectihn are accurate predictors of premature birth at over 24 weeks gestation, but have a poor predictive values before then. Additionally, understanding the risks associated with different gestational ages is a helpful determiner of Gestational age-specific mortality. This way, the rate of infant mortality in preterm births of gestational age above 26-31weeks are significantly lower compared to those under the same age.

Sudden infant death syndrome (SIDS) 

Sudden infant death syndrome (SIDS) is a syndrome where an infant dies in their sleep for no known reason. Even with a complete autopsy, no one has been able to figure out what causes this disease. This disease is more common in Western countries. The United States Center for Disease Control reports SIDS to be the leading cause of death in infants age 1 month to 1 year of life. Even though researchers are not sure what causes this disease, they have discovered that it is healthier for babies to sleep on their backs instead of their stomachs. This discovery saved many families from the tragedy that this disease causes. Scientists have also discovered three causes within a model they created called "the contemporary triple risk model". This model states that three conditions such as the pregnant parent smoking while pregnant, the age of the infant, and stress referring to conditions such as overheating, prone sleeping, co-sleeping, and head covering. In the early 1990s, it was argued immunizations could attribute to an increased risk of SIDS; however, studies since then have proven otherwise and in fact support the idea that vaccinations provide protective properties by reducing the risk of SIDS.

In the United States, approximately 3,500 infants deaths are attributed to sleep-related deaths included in this category is SIDS. For this reason, the American Academy of Pediatrics recommends providing infants with safe-sleeping environments; additionally for the reductions of these sleep-related mortalities, they recommend the prevention of the following, respectively, while pregnant or around infants: exposure to smoke, alcohol, and illicit drugs—this includes second hand smoking. They recommend the following do's: do breastfeed, do schedule immunizations according to proper immunization scheduling, and do use a pacifier.

Congenital malformations 
Congenital malformations are birth defects that babies are born with, such as cleft lip and palate, Down Syndrome, and heart defects. Some congenital malformations may be more likely when the mother consumes alcohol, but can also be caused by genetics or unknown factors.
Congenital malformations have had a significant impact on infant mortality. Malnutrition and infectious diseases were the main cause of death in more undeveloped countries. In the Caribbean and Latin America, congenital malformations only accounted for 5% of infant deaths, while malnutrition and infectious diseases accounted for 7% to 27% of infants deaths in the 1980s. In more developed countries such as the United States, there was a rise in infant deaths due to congenital malformations. These birth defects were mostly due to heart and central nervous system problems. In the 19th century, there was a decrease in the number of infant deaths from heart diseases. From 1979 to 1997, there was a 39% decline in infant mortality due to heart problems.

Medicine and biology 
Causes of infant mortality and deaths that are related to medical conditions include: low birth weight, sudden infant death syndrome, malnutrition, congenital malformations and infectious diseases, and low income for health care including neglected tropical diseases.

The American Academy of Pediatrics recommends that infants need multiple doses of vaccines such as diphtheria–tetanus–acellular pertussis vaccine, Haemophilus influenzae type b (Hib) vaccine, hepatitis B (HepB) vaccine, inactivated polio vaccine (IPV), and pneumococcal vaccine (PCV). Research conducted by the Institute of Medicine's Immunization Safety Review Committee concluded that there is no relationship between these vaccines and the risk of SIDS in infants.

Low birth weight 

Low birth weight makes up 60–80% of the infant mortality rate in developing countries. The New England Journal of Medicine stated that "The lowest mortality rates occur among infants weighing . For infants born weighing  or less, the mortality rate rapidly increases with decreasing weight, and most of the infants weighing  or less die. As compared with normal-birth-weight infants, those with low weight at birth are almost 40 times more likely to die in the neonatal period; for infants with very low weight at birth the relative risk of neonatal death is almost 200 times greater." Infant mortality due to low birth weight is usually a direct cause stemming from other medical complications such as preterm birth, poor maternal nutritional status, lack of prenatal care, maternal sickness during pregnancy, and an unhygienic home environments. Along with birth weight, period of gestation makes up the two most important predictors of an infant's chances of survival and their overall health.

According to the New England Journal of Medicine, "in the past two decades, the infant mortality rate (deaths under one year of age per thousand live births) in the United States has declined sharply." Low birth weights from African American pregnant parent's remain twice as high as that of white people. LBW may be the leading cause of infant deaths, and it is greatly preventable. Although it is preventable, the solutions may not be the easiest but effective programs to help prevent LBW are a combination of health care, education, environment, mental modification and public policy, influencing a culture supporting lifestyle. Preterm birth is the leading cause of newborn deaths worldwide. Even though America excels past many other countries in the care and saving of premature infants, the percentage of American pregnant parent's who deliver prematurely is comparable to those in developing countries. Reasons for this include teenage pregnancy, increase in pregnant parent's over the age of thirty-five, increase in the use of in-vitro fertilization which increases the risk of multiple births, obesity and diabetes. Also, pregnant parent's who do not have access to health care are less likely to visit a doctor, therefore increasing their risk of delivering prematurely.

Malnutrition

Malnutrition or undernutrition is defined as inadequate intake of nourishment, such as proteins and vitamins, which adversely affects the growth, energy and development of people all over the world. It is especially prevalent in pregnant parent's and infants under 5 who live in developing countries within the poorer regions of Africa, Asia, and Latin America. Children are most vulnerable as they have yet to fully develop a strong immune system, as well as being dependent upon parents to provide the necessary food and nutritional intake. It is estimated that about 3.5 million children die each year as a result of childhood or maternal malnutrition, with stunted growth, low body weight and low birth weight accounting for about 2.2 million associated deaths. Factors which contribute to malnutrition are socioeconomic, environmental, gender status, regional location, and breastfeeding cultural practices. It is difficult to assess the most pressing factor as they can intertwine and vary among regions.

Adverse effects of malnutrition
Children suffering from malnutrition face adverse physical effects such as stunting, wasting, or being overweight. Such characteristics entail difference in weight-and-height ratios for age in comparison to adequate standards. In Africa the number of stunted children has risen, while Asia holds the most children under 5 suffering from wasting. The number of overweight children has increased among all regions of the globe. Inadequate nutrients adversely effect physical and cognitive developments, increasing susceptibility to severe health problems. Micronutrient deficiency such as iron has been linked to children with anemia, fatigue, and poor brain development. Similarly, the lack of Vitamin A is the leading cause of blindness among malnourished children. The outcome of malnutrition in children results in decreased ability of the immune system to fight infections, resulting in higher rates of death from diseases such as malaria, respiratory disease and diarrhea.

Infectious diseases
Babies born in low to middle income countries in sub-Saharan Africa and southern Asia are at the highest risk of neonatal death. Bacterial infections of the bloodstream, lungs, and the brain's covering (meningitis) are responsible for 25% of neonatal deaths. Newborns can acquire infections during birth from bacteria that are present in their pregnant parent's reproductive tract. The pregnant parent may not be aware of the infection, or they may have an untreated pelvic inflammatory disease or sexually transmitted disease. These bacteria can move up the vaginal canal into the amniotic sac surrounding the baby. Maternal blood-borne infection is another route of bacterial infection from pregnant parent to baby. Neonatal infection is also more likely with the premature rupture of the membranes (PROM) of the amniotic sac.

Seven out of ten childhood deaths are due to infectious diseases: acute respiratory infection, diarrhea, measles, and malaria. Acute respiratory infection such as pneumonia, bronchitis, and bronchiolitis account for 30% of childhood deaths; 95% of pneumonia cases occur in the developing world. Diarrhea is the second-largest cause of childhood mortality in the world, while malaria causes 11% of childhood deaths. Measles is the fifth-largest cause of childhood mortality. Folic acid for pregnant parents is one way to combat iron deficiency. A few public health measures used to lower levels of iron deficiency anemia include iodize salt or drinking water, and include vitamin A and multivitamin supplements into a pregnant parent's diet. A deficiency of this vitamin causes certain types of anemia (low red blood cell count).

Environmental
Infant mortality rate can be a measure of a nation's health and social condition. It is a composite of a number of component rates which have their separate relationship with various social factors and can often be seen as an indicator to measure the level of socioeconomic disparity within a country.

Organic water pollution is a better indicator of infant mortality than health expenditures per capita. Water contaminated with various pathogens houses a host of parasitic and microbial infections. Infectious disease and parasites are carried via water pollution from animal wastes. Areas of low socioeconomic status are more prone to inadequate plumbing infrastructure, and poorly maintained facilities. The burning of inefficient fuels doubles the rate of children under 5 years old with acute respiratory tract infections. Climate and geography often play a role in sanitation conditions. For example, the inaccessibility of clean water exacerbates poor sanitation conditions.

People who live in areas where particulate matter (PM) air pollution is higher tend to have more health problems across the board. Short-term and long-term effects of ambient air pollution are associated with an increased mortality rate, including infant mortality. Air pollution is consistently associated with post neonatal mortality due to respiratory effects and sudden infant death syndrome (SIDS). Specifically, air pollution is highly associated with SIDS in the United States during the post-neonatal stage. High infant mortality is exacerbated because newborns are a vulnerable subgroup that is affected by air pollution. Newborns who were born into these environments are no exception. People with uterus' who are exposed to greater air pollution on a daily basis who are pregnant should be closely watched by their doctors, as well as after the baby is born. Babies who live in areas with less air pollution have a greater chance of living until their first birthday. As expected, babies who live in environments with more air pollution are at greater risk for infant mortality. Areas that have higher air pollution also have a greater chance of having a higher population density, higher crime rates and lower income levels, all of which can lead to higher infant mortality rates.

The key pollutant for infant mortality rates is carbon monoxide. Carbon monoxide is a colorless, odorless gas that does great harm especially to infants because of their immature respiratory system.
Another major pollutant is second-hand smoke, which is a pollutant that can have detrimental effects on a fetus. According to the American Journal of Public Health, "in 2006, more than 42 000 Americans died of second hand smoke-attributable diseases, including more than 41 000 adults and nearly 900 infants ... fully 36% of the infants who died of low birth weight caused by exposure to maternal smoking in utero were Blacks, as were 28% of those dying of respiratory distress syndrome, 25% dying of other respiratory conditions, and 24% dying of sudden infant death syndrome." The American Journal of Epidemiology also stated that "Compared with nonsmoking women having their first birth, women who smoked less than one pack of cigarettes per day had a 25% greater risk of mortality, and those who smoked one or more packs per day had a 56% greater risk. Among women having their second or higher birth, smokers experienced 30% greater mortality than nonsmokers."

Modern research in the United States on racial disparities in infant mortality suggests a link between the institutionalized racism that pervades the environment and high rates of African American infant mortality. In synthesis of this research, it has been observed that "African American infant mortality remains elevated due to the social arrangements that exist between groups and the lifelong experiences responding to the resultant power dynamics of these arrangements."

It is important to note that infant mortality rates do not decline among African Americans even if their socio-economic status does improve. Parker Dominguez at the University of Southern California has made some headway in determining the reasoning behind this, claiming black women are more prone to psychological stress than other women of different races in the United States. Stress is a lead factor in inducing labor in pregnant women, and therefore high levels of stress during pregnancy could lead to premature births that have the potential to be fatal for the infant.

Early childhood trauma
Early childhood trauma includes physical, sexual, and psychological abuse of a child ages zero to five years-old. Trauma in early development has extreme impact over the course of a lifetime and is a significant contributor to infant mortality. Developing organs are fragile. When an infant is shaken, beaten, strangled, or raped the impact is exponentially more destructive than when the same abuse occurs in a fully developed body. Studies estimate that 1–2 per 100,000 U.S. children annually are fatally injured. Unfortunately, it is reasonable to assume that these statistics underrepresent actual mortality. Three-quarters (70.6 percent) of child fatalities in FFY 2018 involved children younger than 3 years, and children younger than 1 year accounted for 49.4 percent of all fatalities. In particular, correctly identifying deaths due to neglect is problematic, and children with sudden unexpected death or those with what appear to be unintentional causes on the surface often have preventable risk factors which are substantially similar to those in families with maltreatment.

There is a direct relationship between age of maltreatment/injury and risk for death. The younger an infant is, the more dangerous the maltreatment.

Family configuration, child gender, social isolation, lack of support, maternal youth, marital status, poverty, parental ACES, and parenting practices are thought to contribute to increased risk.

Socio-economic factors

Social class is a major factor in infant mortality, both historically and today. Between 1912 and 1915, the Children's Bureau in the United States examined data across eight cities and nearly 23,000 live births. They discovered that lower incomes tend to correlate with higher infant mortality. In cases where the father had no income, the rate of infant mortality was 357% more than that for the highest income earners ($1,250+). Differences between races were also apparent. African-American mothers experience infant mortality at a rate 44% higher than average; however, research indicates that socio-economic factors do not totally account for the racial disparities in infant mortality.

While infant mortality is normally negatively correlated with GDP, there may indeed be some opposing short-term effects from a recession. A recent study by The Economist showed that economic slowdowns reduce the amount of air pollution, which results in a lower infant mortality rate. In the late 1970s and early 1980s, the recession's impact on air quality is estimated to have saved around 1,300 US babies. It is only during deep recessions that infant mortality increases. According to Norbert Schady and Marc-François Smitz, recessions when GDP per capita drops by 15% or more increase infant mortality.

Social class dictates which medical services are available to an individual. Disparities due to socioeconomic factors have been exacerbated by advances in medical technology. Developed countries, most notably the United States, have seen a divergence between those living in poverty who cannot afford medical advanced resources, leading to an increased chance of infant mortality, and others.

Political modernization perspective, the neo-classical economic theory that scarce goods are most effectively distributed to the market, say that the level of political democracy influences the rate of infant mortality. Developing nations with democratic governments tend to be more responsive to public opinion, social movements, and special interest groups for issues like infant mortality. In contrast, non-democratic governments are more interested in corporate issues and less so in health issues. Democratic status effects the dependency a nation has towards its economic state via export, investments from multinational corporations and international lending institutions.

Levels of socioeconomic development and global integration are inversely related to a nation's infant mortality rate. Dependency perspective occurs in a global capital system. A nation's internal impact is highly influenced by its position in the global economy and has adverse effects on the survival of children in developing countries. Countries can experience disproportionate effects from its trade and stratification within the global system. It aids in the global division of labor, distorting the domestic economy of developing nations. The dependency of developing nations can lead to a reduce rate of economic growth, increase income inequality inter- and intra-national, and adversely affects the wellbeing of a nation's population. A collective cooperation between economic countries plays a role in development policies in the poorer, peripheral, countries of the world.

These economic factors present challenges to governments' public health policies. If the nation's ability to raise its own revenues is compromised, governments will lose funding for its health service programs, including services that aim in decreasing infant mortality rates. Peripheral countries face higher levels of vulnerability to the possible negative effects of globalization and trade in relation to key countries in the global market.

Even with a strong economy and economic growth (measured by a country's gross national product), the advances of medical technologies may not be felt by everyone, lending itself to increasing social disparities. In England from 2014 to 2017 a rise in infant mortality was experienced disproportionately in the most deprived local authorities where the previously declining trend in infant mortality was reversed with an additional 24 infant deaths per 100,000 live births per year relative to the previous trend

War
In policy, there is a lag time between realization of a problem's possible solution and actual implementation of policy solutions. Infant mortality rates correlate with war, political unrest, and government corruption.

In most cases, war-affected areas will experience a significant increase in infant mortality rates. Having a war taking place where a person is planning on having a baby is not only stressful on the pregnant person and foetus, but also has several detrimental effects.

However, many other significant factors influence infant mortality rates in war-torn areas. Health care systems in developing countries in the midst of war often collapse. Attaining basic medical supplies and care becomes increasingly difficult. During the Yugoslav Wars in the 1990s Bosnia experienced a 60% decrease in child immunizations. Preventable diseases can quickly become epidemic given the medical conditions during war.

Many developing countries rely on foreign aid for basic nutrition. Transport of aid becomes significantly more difficult in times of war. In most situations the average weight of a population will drop substantially. Expecting mothers are affected even more by lack of access to food and water. During the Yugoslav Wars in Bosnia the number of premature babies born increased and the average birth weight decreased.

There have been several instances in recent years of systematic rape as a weapon of war. People who become pregnant as a result of war rape face even more significant challenges in bearing a healthy child. Studies suggest that people who experience sexual violence before or during pregnancy are more likely to experience infant death in their children. Causes of infant mortality in abused pregnant people range from physical side effects of the initial trauma to psychological effects that lead to poor adjustment to society. Many people who became pregnant by rape in Bosnia were isolated from their hometowns making life after childbirth exponentially more difficult.

Culture 
High rates of infant mortality occur in developing countries where financial and material resources are scarce and there is a high tolerance to high number of infant deaths. There are circumstances where a number of developing countries to breed a culture where situations of infant mortality such as favoring male babies over female babies are the norm. In developing countries such as Brazil, infant mortality rates are commonly not recorded due to failure to register for death certificates. Failure to register is mainly due to the potential loss of time and money and other indirect costs to the family. Even with resource opportunities such as the 1973 Public Registry Law 6015, which allowed free registration for low-income families, the requirements to qualify hold back individuals who are not contracted workers.

Another cultural reason for infant mortality, such as what is happening in Ghana, is that "besides the obvious, like rutted roads, there are prejudices against wives or newborns leaving the house." Because of this it is making it even more difficult for the pregnant people and newborns to get the treatment that is available to them and that is needed.

Cultural influences and lifestyle habits in the United States can account for some deaths in infants throughout the years. According to the Journal of the American Medical Association "the post neonatal mortality risk (28 to 364 days) was highest among continental Puerto Ricans" compared to babies of the non-Hispanic race. Examples of this include teenage pregnancy, obesity, diabetes and smoking. All are possible causes of premature births, which constitute the second highest cause of infant mortality. Ethnic differences experienced in the United States are accompanied by higher prevalence of behavioral risk factors and sociodemographic challenges that each ethnic group faces.

Male sex favoritism
Historically, males have had higher infant mortality rates than females. The difference between male and female infant mortality rates have been dependent on environmental, social, and economic conditions. More specifically, males are biologically more vulnerable to infections and conditions associated with prematurity and development. Before 1970, the reasons for male infant mortality were due to infections, and chronic degenerative diseases. However, since 1970, certain cultures emphasizing males has led to a decrease in the infant mortality gap between males and females. Also, medical advances have resulted in a growing number of male infants surviving at higher rates than females due to the initial high infant mortality rate of males.

Genetic components results in newborn females being biologically advantaged when it comes to surviving their first birthday. Males, biologically, have lower chances of surviving infancy in comparison to female babies. As infant mortality rates saw a decrease on a global scale, the gender most affected by infant mortality changed from males experiences a biological disadvantage, to females facing a societal disadvantage. Some developing nations have social and cultural patterns that reflects adult discrimination to favor boys over girls for their future potential to contribute to the household production level. A country's ethnic composition, homogeneous versus heterogeneous, can explain social attitudes and practices. Heterogeneous level is a strong predictor in explaining infant mortality.

Birth spacing

Birth spacing is the time between births. Births spaced at least three years apart from one another are associated with the lowest rate of mortality. The longer the interval between births, the lower the risk for having any birthing complications, and infant, childhood and maternal mortality. Higher rates of pre-term births, and low birth weight are associated with birth to conception intervals of less than six months and abortion to pregnancy interval of less than six months. Shorter intervals between births increase the chances of chronic and general under-nutrition; 57% of pregnant people in 55 developing countries reported birth spaces shorter than three years; 26% report birth spacing of less than two years. Only 20% of post-partum people report wanting another birth within two years; however, only 40% are taking necessary steps such as family planning to achieve the birth intervals they want.

Unplanned pregnancies and birth intervals of less than twenty-four months are known to correlate with low birth weights and delivery complications. Also, pregnant parent's who are already small in stature tend to deliver smaller than average babies, perpetuating a cycle of being underweight.

Prevention and outcomes
To reduce infant mortality rates across the world, health practitioners, governments, and non-governmental organizations have worked to create institutions, programs and policies to generate better health outcomes. Current efforts focus on development of human resources, strengthening health information systems, health services delivery, etc. Improvements in such areas aim to increase regional health systems and aided in efforts to reduce mortality rates.

Policy
Reductions in infant mortality are possible in any stage of a country's development. Rate reductions are evidence that a country is advancing in human knowledge, social institutions and physical capital. Governments can reduce the mortality rates by addressing the combined need for education (such as universal primary education), nutrition, and access to basic maternal and infant health services. A policy focus has the potential to aid those most at risk for infant and childhood mortality allows rural, poor and migrant populations.

Reducing chances of babies being born at low birth weights and contracting pneumonia can be accomplished by improving air quality. Improving hygiene can prevent infant mortality. Home-based technology to chlorinate, filter, and solar disinfection for organic water pollution could reduce cases of diarrhea in children by up to 48%. Improvements in food supplies and sanitation has been shown to work in the United States' most vulnerable populations, one being African Americans.

Promoting behavioral changes, such as hand washing with soap, can significantly reduce the rate of infant mortality from respiratory and diarrheal diseases. According to UNICEF, hand washing with soap before eating and after using the toilet can save more lives of children by cutting deaths from diarrhea and acute respiratory infections.

Focusing on preventing preterm and low birth weight deliveries throughout all populations can help to eliminate cases of infant mortality and decrease health care disparities within communities. In the United States, these two goals have decreased infant mortality rates on a regional population, it has yet to see further progress on a national level.

Increasing human resources such as physicians, nurses, and other health professionals will increase the number of skilled attendants and the number of people able to give out immunized against diseases such as measles. Increasing the number of skilled professionals is negatively correlated with maternal, infant, and childhood mortality. With the addition of one physician per 10,000 people, there is a potential for 7.08 fewer infant deaths per 10,000.

In certain parts of the U.S., specific modern programs aim to reduce levels of infant mortality. One such program that aims to reduce infant mortality is the "Best Babies Zone" (BBZ) based at the University of California, Berkeley. The BBZ uses the life course approach to address the structural causes of poor birth outcomes and toxic stress in three U.S. neighborhoods. By employing community-generated solutions, the Best Babies Zone's ultimate goal is to achieve health equity in communities that are disproportionately impacted by infant death.

Prenatal care and maternal health 
When a person becomes pregnant, certain steps can help to reduce the chance of complications during the pregnancy. Attending regular prenatal care check-ups will help improve the baby's chances of being delivered in safer conditions and surviving. Additionally, taking supplementation, including folic acid, can help reduce the chances of birth defects, a leading cause of infant mortality. Many countries have instituted mandatory folic acid supplementation in their food supply, which has significantly reduced the occurrence of spina bifida, a birth defect, in newborns. Similarly, the fortification of salt with iodine, salt iodization, has helped reduce adverse birth outcomes associated with low iodine levels during pregnancy.

Abstinence from alcohol can also decrease the chances of harm to the fetus during pregnancy. Drinking any amount of alcohol during pregnancy may lead to fetal alcohol spectrum disorders (FASD) or alcohol related birth defects (ARBD). Tobacco use during pregnancy has also been shown to significantly increase the risk of a preterm or low birth weight birth, both of which are leading causes of infant mortality. Pregnant parent's should consult with their doctors to best manage any existing health conditions that they have to avoid complications of both their health as well as the fetus. Obese people are at an increased risk of developing complications during pregnancy, including gestational diabetes or pre-eclampsia. Additionally, they are more likely to experience a pre-term birth or have a child with birth defects.

Nutrition 
Appropriate nutrition for newborns and infants can help keep them healthy and avoid health complications during early childhood. The American Academy of Pediatrics recommends exclusively breastfeeding infants for the first 6 months of life, following by a combination of breastfeeding and other sources of food through the next 6 months of life, up to 1 year of age. Infants under 6 months of age who are exclusively breastfed have a lower risk of mortality compared to infants who receive a combination of breast milk and other food, as well as no breast milk at all. For this reason, breast feeding is favored over formula feeding by healthcare professionals.

Vaccinations 
The Centers for Disease Control and Prevention (CDC) defines infants as those 1 month of age to 1 year of age. For these infants, the CDC recommends the following vaccinations: Hepatitis B (HepB), Rotavirus (RV), Haemophilus Influenzae type B (HIB), Pneumococcal Conjugate (PCV13), Inactivated Poliovirus (IPV < 18 yrs), Influenza, Varicella, Measles, Mumps, Rubella (MMR), and Diphtheria, tetanus, acellular pertussis (DTapP < 7yrs). Each of these vaccinations are given at particular age ranges depending on the vaccination and are required to be done in a series of 1 to 3 doses over time depending on the vaccination.

The efficacy of these vaccinations can be seen immediately following their introduction to society. Following the advent of the Pneumococcal Conjugate vaccine (PCV13) in the United States in the year 2000, the World Health Organization (WHO) reports studies done in 2004 had shown a 57% decline invasive penicillin-resistant strains of diseases and a 59% reduction in multiple antibiotic resistant strains that could lead to mortality among infants. This reduction was even greater for children under 2 years of age with studies finding an 81% reduction in those same strains.

As mentioned in a previous section, sudden infant death syndrome (SIDS) is the leading cause of infant mortality for those 1 month of age to 1 year of age. Immunizations, when given in accordance to proper guidelines, have shown to reduce the risk of SIDS by 50%. For this reason, the American Academy of Pediatrics (AAP) and the Center for Disease Control (CDC) both recommend immunizations in accordance to their guidelines.

Socio-economic factors
It has been well documented that increased education among mothers, communities, and local health workers results in better family planning, improvement on children's health, and lower rates of children's deaths. High-risk areas, such as Sub-Saharan Africa, have demonstrated that an increase in women's education attainment leads to a reduction in infant mortality by about 35%. Similarly, coordinated efforts to train community health workers in diagnosis, treatment, malnutrition prevention, reporting and referral services has reduced infant mortality in children under 5 as much as 38%. Public health campaigns centered around the "First 1,000 Days" of conception have been successful in providing cost-effective supplemental nutrition programs, as well as assisting young post-partum parent's in sanitation, hygiene and breastfeeding promotion. Increased intake of nutrients and better sanitation habits have a positive impact on health, especially developing children. Educational attainment and public health campaigns provide the knowledge and means to practice better habits and leads to better outcomes against infant mortality rates.

Awareness of health services, education, and economic opportunities provide means to sustain and increase chance of development and survival. A decrease in GDP, for example, results in increased rates of infant mortality. Negative effects on household income reduces amount being spent on food and healthcare, affecting the quality of life and access to medical services to ensure full development and survival. On the contrary, increased household income translates to more access to nutrients and healthcare, reducing the risks associated with malnutrition and infant mortality. Moreover, increased aggregate household incomes will produce better health facilities, water and sewer infrastructures for the entire community.

Differences in measurement

The infant mortality rate correlates very strongly with, and is among the best predictors of, state failure. IMR is therefore also a useful indicator of a country's level of health or development, and is a component of the physical quality of life index.

However, the method of calculating IMR often varies widely between countries and is based on how they define a live birth and how many premature infants are born in the country. Reporting of infant mortality rates can be inconsistent, and may be understated, depending on a nation's live birth criterion, vital registration system, and reporting practices. The reported IMR provides one statistic which reflects the standard of living in each nation. Changes in the infant mortality rate reflect social and technical capacities of a nation's population. The World Health Organization (WHO) defines a live birth as any infant born demonstrating independent signs of life, including breathing, heartbeat, umbilical cord pulsation or definite movement of voluntary muscles. This definition is used in Austria, for example. The WHO definition is also used in Germany, but with one slight modification: muscle movement is not considered to be a sign of life. Many countries, however, including certain European states (e.g. France) and Japan, only count as live births cases where an infant breathes at birth, which makes their reported IMR numbers somewhat lower and increases their rates of perinatal mortality. In the Czech Republic and Bulgaria, for instance, requirements for live birth are even higher.

Although many countries have vital registration systems and certain reporting practices, there are many inaccuracies, particularly in undeveloped nations, in the statistics of the number of infants dying. Studies have shown that comparing three information sources (official registries, household surveys, and popular reporters) that the "popular death reporters" are the most accurate. Popular death reporters include midwives, gravediggers, coffin builders, priests, and others—essentially people who knew the most about the child's death. In developing nations, access to vital registries, and other government-run systems which record births and deaths, is difficult for poor families for several reasons. These struggles force stress on families, and make them take drastic measures in unofficial death ceremonies for their deceased infants. As a result, government statistics will inaccurately reflect a nation's infant mortality rate. Popular death reporters have first-hand information, and provided this information can be collected and collated, can provide reliable data which provide a nation with accurate death counts and meaningful causes of deaths that can be measured/studied.

UNICEF uses a statistical methodology to account for reporting differences among countries:

Another challenge to comparability is the practice of counting frail or premature infants who die before the normal due date as miscarriages (spontaneous abortions) or those who die during or immediately after childbirth as stillborn. Therefore, the quality of a country's documentation of perinatal mortality can matter greatly to the accuracy of its infant mortality statistics. This point is reinforced by the demographer Ansley Coale, who finds dubiously high ratios of reported stillbirths to infant deaths in Hong Kong and Japan in the first 24 hours after birth, a pattern that is consistent with the high recorded sex ratios at birth in those countries. It suggests not only that many female infants who die in the first 24 hours are misreported as stillbirths rather than infant deaths, but also that those countries do not follow WHO recommendations for the reporting of live births and infant deaths.

Another seemingly paradoxical finding, is that when countries with poor medical services introduce new medical centers and services, instead of declining, the reported IMRs often increase for a time. This is mainly because improvement in access to medical care is often accompanied by improvement in the registration of births and deaths. Deaths that might have occurred in a remote or rural area, and not been reported to the government, might now be reported by the new medical personnel or facilities. Thus, even if the new health services reduce the actual IMR, the reported IMR may increase.

Collecting the accurate statistics of infant mortality rate could be an issue in some rural communities in developing countries. In those communities, some other alternative methods for calculating infant mortality rate are emerged, for example, popular death reporting and household survey.
The country-to-country variation in child mortality rates is huge, and growing wider despite the progress. Among the world's roughly 200 nations, only Somalia showed no decrease in the under-5 mortality rate over the past two decades. The lowest rate in 2011 was in Singapore, which had 2.6 deaths of children under age 5 per 1,000 live births. The highest was in Sierra Leone, which had 185 child deaths per 1,000 births. The global rate is 51 deaths per 1,000 births. For the United States, the rate is eight per 1,000 births.

Infant mortality rate (IMR) is not only a group of statistic but instead it is a reflection of the socioeconomic development and effectively represents the presence of medical services in the countries. IMR is an effective resource for the health department to make decision on medical resources reallocation. IMR also formulates the global health strategies and help evaluate the program success. The existence of IMR helps solve the inadequacies of the other vital statistic systems for global health as most of the vital statistic systems usually neglect the infant mortality statistic number from the poor. There are certain amounts of unrecorded infant deaths in the rural area as they do not have information about infant mortality rate statistic or do not have the concept about reporting early infant death.

Europe and US

The exclusion of any high-risk infants from the denominator or numerator in reported IMRs can cause problems in making comparisons. Many countries, including the United States, Sweden and Germany, count an infant exhibiting any sign of life as alive, no matter the month of gestation or the size, but according to United States some other countries differ in these practices. All of the countries named adopted the WHO definitions in the late 1980s or early 1990s, which are used throughout the European Union. However, in 2009, the US CDC issued a report that stated that the American rates of infant mortality were affected by the United States' high rates of premature babies compared to European countries. It also outlined the differences in reporting requirements between the United States and Europe, noting that France, the Czech Republic, Ireland, the Netherlands, and Poland do not report all live births of babies under 500 g and/or 22 weeks of gestation. However, the differences in reporting are unlikely to be the primary explanation for the high rate of infant mortality in the United States' compared with its peer countries at a similar level of economic development. Rather, the report concluded that the primary reason for the United States' higher infant mortality rate when compared with Europe was the United States' much higher percentage of preterm births.

Until the 1990s, Russia and the Soviet Union did not count, as a live birth or as an infant death, extremely premature infants (less than 1,000 g, less than 28 weeks gestational age, or less than 35 cm in length) that were born alive (breathed, had a heartbeat, or exhibited voluntary muscle movement) but failed to survive for at least seven days. Although such extremely premature infants typically accounted for only about 0.5% of all live-born children, their exclusion from both the numerator and the denominator in the reported IMR led to an estimated 22%–25% lower reported IMR. In some cases, too, perhaps because hospitals or regional health departments were held accountable for lowering the IMR in their catchment area, infant deaths that occurred in the 12th month were "transferred" statistically to the 13th month (i.e., the second year of life), and thus no longer classified as an infant death.

Brazil
In certain rural developing areas, such as northeastern Brazil, infant births are often not recorded in the first place, resulting in the discrepancies between the infant mortality rate (IMR) and the actual number of infant deaths. Access to vital registry systems for infant births and deaths is an extremely difficult and expensive task for poor parents living in rural areas. Government and bureaucracies tend to show an insensitivity to these parents and their recent suffering from a deceased child and produce broad disclaimers in the IMR reports that the information has not been properly reported, resulting in these discrepancies. Little has been done to address the underlying structural problems of the vital registry systems in respect to the lack of reporting from parents in rural areas, and in turn has created a gap between the official and popular meanings of child death. It is also argued that the bureaucratic separation of vital death recording from cultural death rituals is to blame for the inaccuracy of the infant mortality rate (IMR). Vital death registries often fail to recognize the cultural implications and importance of infant deaths. It is not to be said that vital registry systems are not an accurate representation of a region's socio-economic situation, but this is only the case if these statistics are valid, which is unfortunately not always the circumstance. "Popular death reporters" is an alternative method for collecting and processing statistics on infant and child mortality. Many regions may benefit from "popular death reporters" who are culturally linked to infants may be able to provide more accurate statistics on the incidence of infant mortality. According to ethnographic data, "popular death reporters" refers to people who had inside knowledge of anjinhos, including the grave-digger, gatekeeper, midwife, popular healers etc.—all key participants in mortuary rituals. By combining the methods of household surveys, vital registries, and asking "popular death reporters" this can increase the validity of child mortality rates, but there are many barriers that can reflect the validity of our statistics of infant mortality. One of these barriers are political economic decisions. Numbers are exaggerated when international funds are being doled out; and underestimated during reelection.

The bureaucratic separation of vital death reporting and cultural death rituals stems in part due to structural violence. Individuals living in rural areas of Brazil need to invest large capital for lodging and travel in order to report infant birth to a Brazilian Assistance League office. The negative financial aspects deters registration, as often individuals are of lower income and cannot afford such expenses. Similar to the lack of birth reporting, families in rural Brazil face difficult choices based on already existing structural arrangements when choosing to report infant mortality. Financial constraints such as reliance on food supplementations may also lead to skewed infant mortality data.

In developing countries such as Brazil the deaths of impoverished infants are regularly unrecorded into the countries vital registration system; this causes a skew statistically. Culturally validity and contextual soundness can be used to ground the meaning of mortality from a statistical standpoint. In northeast Brazil they have accomplished this standpoint while conducting an ethnographic study combined with an alternative method to survey infant mortality. These types of techniques can develop quality ethnographic data that will ultimately lead to a better portrayal of the magnitude of infant mortality in the region. Political economic reasons have been seen to skew the infant mortality data in the past when governor Ceara devised his presidency campaign on reducing the infant mortality rate during his term in office. By using this new way of surveying, these instances can be minimized and removed, overall creating accurate and sound data.

Epidemiology

For the world, and for both less developed countries (LDCs) and more developed countries (MDCs), IMR declined significantly between 1960 and 2001. According to the State of the World's Mothers report by Save the Children, the world IMR declined from 126 in 1960 to 57 in 2001. The global neonatal mortality rate, NMR, decreased from 36.6 in 1990 to 18.0 in 2017.

However, IMR was, and remains, higher in LDCs. In 2001, the IMR for LDCs (91) was about 10 times as large as it was for MDCs (8). On average, for LDCs, the IMR is 17 times higher than that of MDCs. Also, while both LDCs and MDCs made significant reductions in IMR, reductions among less developed countries are, on average, much less than those among the more developed countries. Among many low- and middle-income countries, there is also substantial variation in infant mortality rate at a subnational level.

A factor of about 67 separate countries with the highest and lowest reported infant mortality rates. The top and bottom five countries by this measure (taken from The World Factbook's 2013 estimates) are shown below.

United States

Of the 27 most developed countries, the U.S. has the highest Infant Mortality Rate, despite spending much more on health care per capita. Significant racial and socio-economic differences in the United States affect the IMR, in contrast with other developed countries, which have more homogeneous populations. In particular, IMR varies greatly by race in the US. The average IMR for the whole country is therefore not a fair representation of the wide variations that exist between segments of the population. Many theories have been explored as to why these racial differences exist with socio economic factors usually coming out as a reasonable explanation. However, more studies have been conducted around this matter, and the largest advancement is around the idea of stress and how it affects pregnancy.

In the 1850s, the infant mortality rate in the United States was estimated at 216.8 per 1,000 babies born for whites and 340.0 per 1,000 for African Americans, but rates have significantly declined in the West in modern times. This declining rate has been mainly due to modern improvements in basic health care, technology, and medical advances. In the last century, the infant mortality rate has decreased by 93%. Overall, the rates have decreased drastically from 20 deaths in 1970 to 6.9 deaths in 2003 (per every 1000 live births). In 2003, the leading causes of infant mortality in the United States were congenital anomalies, disorders related to immaturity, AIDS, and maternal complications. Babies born with low birth weight increased to 8.1% while cigarette smoking during pregnancy declined to 10.2%. This reflected the amount of low birth weights concluding that 12.4% of births from smokers were low birth weights compared with 7.7% of such births from non-smokers. According to the New York Times, "the main reason for the high rate is preterm delivery, and there was a 10% increase in such births from 2000 to 2006." Between 2007 and 2011, however, the preterm birth rate has decreased every year. In 2011 there was an 11.73% rate of babies born before the 37th week of gestation, down from a high of 12.80% in 2006.

Economic expenditures on labor and delivery and neonatal care are relatively high in the United States. A conventional birth averages US$9,775 with a C-section costing US$15,041. Preterm births in the US have been estimated to cost $51,600 per child, with a total yearly cost of $26.2 billion. Despite this spending, several reports state that infant mortality rate in the United States is significantly higher than in other developed nations. Estimates vary; the CIA's World Factbook ranks the US 55th internationally in 2014, with a rate of 6.17, while the UN figures from 2005 to 2010 place the US 34th.

Aforementioned differences in measurement could play a substantial role in the disparity between the US and other nations. A non-viable live birth in the US could be registered as a stillbirth in similarly developed nations like Japan, Sweden, Norway, Ireland, the Netherlands, and France—thereby reducing the infant death count. Neonatal intensive care is also more likely to be applied in the US to marginally viable infants, although such interventions have been found to increase both costs and disability. A study following the implementation of the Born Alive Infant Protection Act of 2002 found universal resuscitation of infants born between 20 and 23 weeks increased the neonatal spending burden by $313.3 million while simultaneously decreasing quality-adjusted life years by 329.3.

The vast majority of research conducted in the late twentieth and early twenty-first century indicates that African-American infants are more than twice as likely to die in their first year of life than white infants. Although following a decline from 13.63 to 11.46 deaths per 1000 live births from 2005 to 2010, non-Hispanic black parents continued to report a rate 2.2 times as high as that for non-Hispanic white parents.

Contemporary research findings have demonstrated that nationwide racial disparities in infant mortality are linked to the experiential state of the postpartum parent and that these disparities cannot be totally accounted for by socio-economic, behavioral or genetic factors. The Hispanic paradox, an effect observed in other health indicators, appears in the infant mortality rate, as well. Hispanic postpartum parents see an IMR comparable to non-Hispanic white postpartum parents, despite lower educational attainment and economic status. A study in North Carolina, for example, concluded that "white women who did not complete high school have a lower infant mortality rate than black college graduates." According to Mustillo's CARDIA (Coronary Artery Risk Development in Young Adults) study, "self reported experiences of racial discrimination were associated with pre-term and low-birthweight deliveries, and such experiences may contribute to black-white disparities in prenatal outcomes." Likewise, dozens of population-based studies indicate that "the subjective, or perceived experience of racial discrimination is strongly associated with an increased risk of infant death and with poor health prospects for future generations of African Americans."

African American 
While earlier parts of this article have addressed the racial differences in infant deaths, a closer look into the effects of racial differences within the country is necessary to view discrepancies. Non-Hispanic Black women lead all other racial groups in IMR with a rate of 11.3, while the Infant Mortality Rate among white women is 5.1. Black women in the United States experience a shorter life expectancy than white women, so while a higher IMR amongst black women is not necessarily out of line, it is still rather disturbing. While the popular argument leads to the idea that due to the trend of a lower socio-economic status had by black women there is in an increased likelihood of a child suffering. While this does correlate, the theory that it is the contributing factor falls apart when we look at Latino IMR in the United States. Latino people are almost just as likely to experience poverty as blacks in the U.S., however, the Infant Mortality Rate of Latinos is much closer to white women than it is to black women. The Poverty Rates of blacks and Latinos are 24.1% and 21.4% respectively. If there is a direct correlation, then the IMR of these two groups should be rather similar, however, blacks have an IMR double that of Latinos. Also, as black women move out of poverty or never experienced it in the first place, their IMR is not much lower than their counterparts experiencing higher levels of poverty.

Some believe black women are predisposed to a higher IMR, meaning ancestrally speaking, all black women from African descent should experience an elevated rate. This theory is quickly disproven by looking at women of African descent who have immigrated to the United States. These women who come from a completely different social context are not prone to the higher IMR experienced by American-born black women.

Tyan Parker Dominguez at the University of Southern California offers a theory to explain the disproportionally high IMR among black women in the United States. She claims African American women experience stress at much higher rates than any other group in the country. Stress produces particular hormones that induce labor and contribute to other pregnancy problems. Considering early births are one of the leading causes of death of infants under the age of one, induced labor is a very legitimate factor. The idea of stress spans socio-economic status as Parker Dominguez claims stress for lower-class women comes from unstable family life and chronic worry over poverty. For black middle-class women, battling racism, real or perceived, can be an extreme stressor.

Arline Geronimus, a professor at the University of Michigan School of Public Health calls the phenomenon "weathering". She claims constantly dealing with disadvantages and racial prejudice causes black women's birth outcomes to deteriorate with age. Therefore, younger black women may experience stress with pregnancy due to social and economic factors, but older women experience stress at a compounding rate and therefore have pregnancy complications aside from economic factors.

Mary O. Hearst, a professor in the Department of Public Health at Saint Catherine University, researched the effects of segregation on the African American community to see if it contributed to the high IMR amongst black children. Hearst claims that residential segregation contributes to the high rates because of the political, economic, and negative health implications it poses on black mothers regardless of their socioeconomic status. Racism, economic disparities, and sexism in segregated communities are all examples of the daily stressors that pregnant black women face that can affect their pregnancies with conditions such as pre-eclampsia and hypertension.

Studies have also shown that high IMR is due to the inadequate care that pregnant African Americans receive compared to other women in the country. In another study, it was shown that Black patients were more likely to receive Ibuprofen after surgery instead of Oxycodone. Several peer-reviewed articles have documented a difference in the levels of care a patient receives when they were black even when they had insurance. IMR does not decrease based on age, or when accounting for higher education suggesting that there is a racial element. This unequal treatment stems from the idea that there are racial medical differences and is also rooted in racial biases and controlled images of black women. Because of this unequal treatment, research on maternal and prenatal care received by African American women and their infants, finds that black women do not receive the same urgency in medical care; they are also not taken as seriously regarding pain they feel or complications they think they are having, as exemplified by the complications tennis-star Serena Williams faced during her delivery.

There is additional element that must be considered, the effect of both race and gender. Misogynoir is a commonly cited and overlooked issue. Black feminists have often been cited as the backbone of numerous Civil Rights events, but feel they are overlooked when it comes to meaningful change for that positively changes the lives of Black women primarily. During the June 2020 Black Lives Matter protests, many black feminists criticized the movement for excluding them. When examined through this lens, the increased rates of IMR of African American women becomes a matter of equity and an issue of social justice.

Strides have been made, however, to combat this epidemic. In Los Angeles County, health officials have partnered with non-profits around the city to help black women after the delivery of their child. One non-profit in particular has made a large impact on many lives is Great Beginnings For Black Babies in Inglewood. The non-profit centers around helping women deal with stress by forming support networks, keeping an open dialogue around race and family life, and also finding these women a secure place in the workforce.

Some research argues that to end high IMR amongst black children, the country needs to fix the social and societal issues that plague African Americans. Some scholars argue that Issues such as institutional racism, mass incarceration, poverty, and health care disparities that are present amongst the African American country need to be addressed by the United States Government in order for policy to be created to combat these issues. Following this theory, if institutional inequalities are addresses and repaired by the United States Government, daily stressors for African Americans, and African American women in particular, will be reduced, therefore lessening the risk of complications in pregnancy and infant mortality. Others argue that adding diversity in the health care industry can help reduce the high IMR because more representation can tackle deep-rooted racial biases and stereotypes that exist towards African American women. Another more recent form of action to reduce high IMR amongst black children is the use of doulas throughout pregnancy.

United Kingdom
A study published in the British Medical Journal in 2019 found that the rate of infant mortality in England had increased with an additional 24 infant deaths per 100,000 live births per year. There was no significant change from the pre-existing trend in the most affluent local authorities. The rise disproportionately affected the poorest areas of the country, and was attributed largely to rising child poverty, as a result of sustained reductions in the welfare benefits available to families with children.

History 

It was in the early 1900s that countries around the world started to notice that there was a need for better child health care services. This started from Europe, the United States fell behind them by creating a campaign to decrease the infant mortality rate. With this program, they were able to lower the IMR to 10 deaths rather than 100 deaths per every 1000 births. Infant mortality was also seen as a social problem when it was being noticed as a national problem. American women who had middle class standing with an educational background started to create a movement that provided housing for families of a lower class. By starting this, they were able to establish public health care and government agencies that were able to make more sanitary and healthier environments for infants. Medical professionals helped further the cause for infant health by creating a pediatrics field that was experienced in medicine for children.

United States
Decreases in infant mortality in given countries across the world during the 20th century have been linked to several common trends, scientific advancements, and social programs. Some of these include the state improving sanitation, improving access to healthcare, improving education, and the development of medical advancements such as penicillin, and safer blood transfusions.

In the United States, improving infant mortality in the early half of the 20th century meant tackling environmental factors. Improving sanitation, and especially access to safe drinking water, helped the United States dramatically decrease infant mortality, a growing concern in the United States since the 1850s. On top of these environmental factors, during this time the United States endeavored to increase education and awareness regarding infant mortality. Pasteurization of milk also helped the United States combat infant mortality in the early 1900s, a practice which allowed the United States to curb disease in infants. These factors, on top of a general increase in the standard of living for those living in urban settings, helped the United States make dramatic improvements in their rates of infant mortality in the early 20th century.

Although the overall infant mortality rate was sharply dropping during this time, within the United States infant mortality varied greatly among racial and socio-economic groups. The change in infant mortality from 1915 to 1933 was, for the white population, 98.6 in 1,000 to 52.8 in 1,000, and for the black population, 181.2 in 1,000 to 94.4 in 1,000. Studies imply that this has a direct correlation with relative economic conditions between these populations. Additionally, infant mortality in southern states was consistently 2% higher than other states in the US across a 20-year period from 1985. Southern states also tend to perform worse in predictors for higher infant mortality, such as per capita income and poverty rate.

In the latter half of the 20th century, a focus on greater access to medical care for women spurred declines in infant mortality in the United States. The implementation of Medicaid, granting wider access to healthcare, contributed to a dramatic decrease in infant mortality, in addition to access to greater access to legal abortion and family-planning care, such the IUD and the birth control pill.

In the decades following the 1970s, the United States' decreasing infant mortality rates began to slow, falling behind China's, Cuba's, and other developed countries'. Funding for the federally subsidized Medicaid and Maternal and Infant Care was sharply reduced, and availability of prenatal care greatly decreased for low-income parents.

China 
The People's Republic of China's growth of medical resources in the latter half of the 20th century partly explains its dramatic improvement with regards to infant mortality during this time. Part of this increase included the adoption of the Rural Cooperative Medical System, which was founded in the 1950s. The Cooperative Medical System granted healthcare access to previously underserved rural populations, is estimated to have covered 90% of China's rural population throughout the 1960s. The Cooperative Medical System achieved an infant mortality rate of 25.09 per 1,000. The Cooperative Medical System was later defunded, leaving many rural populations to rely on an expensive fee-for-service system, although the rate continued to decline in general. This change in medical systems caused a socio-economic gap in accessibility to medical care in China, which fortunately was not reflected in its infant mortality rate of decline. Prenatal care was increasingly used, even as the Cooperative Medical System was replaced, and delivery assistance remained accessible.

China's one-child policy, adopted in the 1980s, negatively impacted its infant mortality. Women carrying unapproved pregnancies faced state consequences and social stigma and were thus less likely to use prenatal care. Additionally, economic realities and long-held cultural factors incentivized male offspring, leading some families who already had sons to avoid prenatal care or professional delivery services, and causing China to have unusually high female infant mortality rates during this time.

See also 
List of countries by infant mortality rate
List of countries by maternal mortality ratio
Maternal mortality
Miscarriage
Stillbirth

Related statistical categories:
 Perinatal mortality only includes deaths between the foetal viability (22 weeks gestation) and the end of the 7th day after delivery.
 Neonatal mortality only includes deaths in the first 28 days of life.
 Postneonatal mortality only includes deaths after 28 days of life but before one year.
 Child mortality Includes deaths before the age of 5.

References

External links 

Child and infant mortality estimates for all countries - website by UNICEF

 
Population
Public health